Gorlosen is a municipality in the Ludwigslust-Parchim district, in Mecklenburg-Vorpommern, Germany.

Notable people

References

Ludwigslust-Parchim
Grand Duchy of Mecklenburg-Schwerin